Manolis Papasterianos (born 15 August 1987) is a Greek professional footballer who plays as a defensive midfielder for Super League 2 club Iraklis, for which he is captain.

Club career
Papasterianos started his career in the team of his hometown M.G.C Akanthos Ierissos at a young age. His impressive performances caught the eye of Iraklis' scouts and he joined Iraklis' youth squad in the summer of 2005.

Iraklis

Papasterianos got promoted in the Iraklis' professional squad for the 2006-2007 season. He debuted for the club in a 3–0 loss against AEK, coming in as a substitute in the 63rd minute. Two minutes after his entrance in the match, he got the first yellow card in his professional career. Papasterianos also made his European debut in that season. It was in the 0–1 away win against Wisła Kraków for the first leg of the 2006–07 UEFA Cup, as he came in, as a substitute. In the second half of the season Papasterianos made 13 appearances for the club, 10 of them as a starter. In the 2008-2009 season Papasterianos established himself as a starter in Iraklis. He made 26 appearances, 15 as a starter, and scored 2 goals. His first goal was scored in an away match against Panathinaikos, helping Iraklis to grab a 2–2 away draw. His second goal was a bicycle kick scored against Ergotelis, to help the team secure a 0–1 away win.  That goal was voted as Best Goal of the 2008-2009 season, in the official competition organised by the Superleague. It was as well voted as Best Goal of the 21st matchday of the 2008-2009 Superleague season. In the 2009-2010 season he was almost an automatic first team choice, appearing in 22 of the first 23 matches of the club, 15 of them as a starter. But due to an injury in the abdominal muscles area he had to undergo surgery in Germany. As a result, he was forced to stay out for the remainder of the season. In the 2010-2011 season he once again scored a goal that was voted as Best Goal of the matchday. It was a screamer from well outside the area, scored in a 2–0 victory of Iraklis against AEK, for the 15th matchday of the 2010-2011 Superleague season.  The prize was handed to him by former Iraklis striker Fanis Tountziaris.

Aris

In 2011 summer, Papasterianos joined Aris Thessaloniki F.C., getting the number 5. He has made 9 league appearances in the first season making his debut with the club on 27 August 2011 in an away draw against PAS Giannena, but his performances weren't so good. Nevertheless, he succeeded to become an important member of the club and especially in the season 2012/13 was on the key players that helped Aris to avoid relegation. At the end of the season he didn't manage to reach an agreement with the new President of Aris and in the summer of 2013 he signed a 1-year contract with the Romanian club Concordia Chiajna.

CS Concordia Chiajna

Papasterianos' adaptation to a new environment for the first time in his career was not easy. He debuted with the club on 30 September 2013 in a lost away game against Ceahlăul Piatra Neamţ.

Xanthi

After a year in Romania, Papasterianos returned to Greek Super League playing for Skoda Xanthi. After two years with the club, he solved his contract having 57 appearances (4 goals, 2 assists) in all competitions.

Veria
On 20 August 2016, Papasterianos signed a two years' contract with Veria for an undisclosed fee.

Second spell in Xanthi 
On 5 January 2017, Xanthi FC officially announced on Thursday the signing of experienced defensive midfielder Manolis Papasterianos, who was recently released from Veria.

OFI
On 25 August 2017, Papasterianos signed a year contract with Football League club OFI for an undisclosed fee.

International career
Papasterianos has been capped twice at U-21 level for Greece. He made his debut in a friendly match against Ethnikos Asteras, coming in as a substitute in the 39th minute for Sotiris Balafas. His second match was played in Neapoli Stadium against Albania U-21. Papasterianos was replaced at half-time with the score being 2-0 for Greece U-21. The final score of the match was 3–1. During a match against Skoda Xanthi Papasterianos was watched by Zisis Vryzas, Greece's assistant manager.

Personal life
Manolis Papasterianos' younger brother, Angelos, plays for Iraklis as a centre-back.

Statistics

Club

1Includes Greek Superleague playoffs.

References

External links
 Papasterianos' profile in Iraklis' Official site
 Best Goal of 2008-2009 Superleague season
 Best Goal of the 21st matchday of the 2010-2011 Superleagueseason

Living people
1987 births
Greek footballers
Greece under-21 international footballers
Greek expatriate footballers
Super League Greece players
Football League (Greece) players
Super League Greece 2 players
Liga I players
Iraklis Thessaloniki F.C. players
Aris Thessaloniki F.C. players
CS Concordia Chiajna players
Xanthi F.C. players
OFI Crete F.C. players
Greek expatriate sportspeople in Romania
Expatriate footballers in Romania
Association football defenders
Association football midfielders
People from Stagira-Akanthos
Footballers from Central Macedonia